Pitalito Airport  is an airport serving the town of Pitalito in the Huila Department of Colombia.

Airlines and destinations

See also

Transport in Colombia
List of airports in Colombia

References

External links
OpenStreetMap - Pitalito
OurAirports - Pitalito
SkyVector - Pitalito
Pitalito Airport

Airports in Colombia